"Chains of Love" is a song written by Ahmet Nugetre and Harry VanWalls, and recorded by American country music artist Mickey Gilley.  It was released in October 1977 as the third and final single from his album First Class.  The song reached number 9 on the U.S. Billboard Hot Country Singles chart and number 7 on the Canadian RPM Country Tracks chart in Canada.

Chart performance

References

1977 singles
1977 songs
Mickey Gilley songs
Song recordings produced by Eddie Kilroy
Playboy Records singles
Songs written by Ahmet Ertegun